Plesno may refer to the following places:
Pleśno, Lubusz Voivodeship (west Poland)
Pleśno, Bartoszyce County in Warmian-Masurian Voivodeship (north Poland)
Pleśno, Ostróda County in Warmian-Masurian Voivodeship (north Poland)
Płęsno, Pomeranian Voivodeship (north Poland)